Amazon Web Services, Inc. (AWS) is a subsidiary of Amazon that provides on-demand cloud computing platforms and APIs to individuals, companies, and governments, on a metered, pay-as-you-go basis. Often times, clients will use this in combination with autoscaling (a process that allows a client to use more compute in times of high application usage, and then scale down to reduce costs when there is less traffic). These cloud computing web services provide various services related to networking, compute, storage, middleware, IOT and other processing capacity, as well as software tools via AWS server farms.  This frees clients from managing, scaling, and patching hardware and operating systems. 
One of the foundational services is Amazon Elastic Compute Cloud (EC2), which allows users to have at their disposal a virtual cluster of computers, with extremely high availability, which can be interacted with over the internet via REST APIs, a CLI or the AWS console.  AWS's virtual computers emulate most of the attributes of a real computer, including hardware central processing units (CPUs) and graphics processing units (GPUs) for processing; local/RAM memory; hard-disk/SSD storage; a choice of operating systems; networking; and pre-loaded application software such as web servers, databases, and customer relationship management (CRM).

AWS services are delivered to customers via a network of AWS server farms located throughout the world. Fees are based on a combination of usage (known as a "Pay-as-you-go" model), hardware, operating system, software, or networking features chosen by the subscriber required availability, redundancy, security, and service options. Subscribers can pay for a single virtual AWS computer, a dedicated physical computer, or clusters of either. Amazon provides select portions of security for subscribers (e.g. physical security of the data centers) while other aspects of security are the responsibility of the subscriber (e.g. account management, vulnerability scanning, patching). AWS operates from many global geographical regions including seven in North America.

Amazon markets AWS to subscribers as a way of obtaining large-scale computing capacity more quickly and cheaply than building an actual physical server farm. All services are billed based on usage, but each service measures usage in varying ways. As of 2021 Q4, AWS has 33% market share for cloud infrastructure while the next two competitors Microsoft Azure and Google Cloud have 21%, and 10% respectively, according to Synergy Group.

Services 

As of 2021, AWS comprises over 200 products and services including computing, storage, networking, database, analytics, application services, deployment, management, machine learning, mobile, developer tools, RobOps and tools for the Internet of Things. The most popular include Amazon Elastic Compute Cloud (EC2), Amazon Simple Storage Service (Amazon S3), Amazon Connect, and AWS Lambda (a serverless function that can perform arbitrary code written in any language that can be configured to be triggered by hundreds of events, including http calls).

Services expose functionality through APIs for clients to use in their applications.  These APIs are accessed over HTTP, using the REST architectural style and SOAP protocol for older APIs and exclusively JSON for newer ones. Clients can interact with these APIs in various ways, including from the AWS console (a website), by using SDKs written in various languages (such as Python, Java, and JavaScript), or by making direct REST calls.

History

Founding (2000–2005) 

The genesis of AWS came in the early . After building Merchant.com, Amazon's e-commerce-as-a-service platform that offers third-party retailers a way to build their own web-stores, Amazon pursued service-oriented architecture as a means to scale its engineering operations, led by then CTO Allan Vermeulen.

Around the same time frame, Amazon was frustrated with the speed of its software engineering, and sought to implement various recommendations put forth by Matt Round, an engineering leader at the time, including maximization of autonomy for engineering teams, adoption of REST, standardization of infrastructure, removal of gate-keeping decision-makers (bureaucracy), and continuous deployment. He also called for increasing the percentage of the time engineers spent building the software rather than doing other tasks. Amazon created "a shared IT platform" so its engineering organizations, which were spending 70% of their time on "undifferentiated heavy-lifting" such as IT and infrastructure problems, could focus on customer-facing innovation instead. Besides, in dealing with unusual peak traffic patterns, especially during the holiday season, by migrating services to commodity Linux hardware and relying on open source software, Amazon's Infrastructure team, led by Tom Killalea, Amazon's first CISO, had already run its data centers and associated services in a "fast, reliable, cheap" way.

In July 2002, Amazon.com Web Services, managed by Colin Bryar, launched its first web services, opening up the Amazon.com platform to all developers. Over one hundred applications were built on top of it by 2004.  This unexpected developer interest took Amazon by surprise and convinced them that developers were "hungry for more."

By the Summer of 2003, Andy Jassy had taken over Bryar's portfolio at Rick Dalzell's behest, after Vermeulen, who was Bezos' first pick, declined the offer. Jassy subsequently mapped out the vision for an "Internet OS" made up of foundational infrastructure primitives that alleviated key impediments to shipping software applications faster. By fall 2003, databases, storage, and compute were identified as the first set of infrastructure pieces that Amazon should launch.

Jeff Barr, an early AWS employee, credits Vermeulen, Jassy, Bezos, himself, and a few others for coming up with the idea that would evolve into EC2, S3, and RDS;  Jassy recalls the idea was the result of brainstorming for about a week with "ten of the best technology minds and ten of the best product management minds" on about ten different Internet applications and the most primitive building blocks required to build them. Werner Vogels cites Amazon's desire to make the process of "invent, launch, reinvent, relaunch, start over, rinse, repeat" as fast as it could be leading them to break down organizational structures with "two-pizza teams" and application structures with distributed systems; and that these changes ultimately paved way for the formation of AWS and its mission "to expose all of the atomic-level pieces of the Amazon.com platform". According to Brewster Kahle, co-founder of Alexa Internet, which was acquired by Amazon in 1999, his start-up's compute infrastructure helped Amazon solve its big data problems and later informed the innovations that underpinned AWS.

Jassy assembled a founding team of 57 employees from a mix of engineering and business backgrounds to kick-start these initiatives, with a majority of the hires coming from outside the company; Jeff Lawson, Twilio CEO, Adam Selipsky, Tableau CEO, Mikhail Seregine, co-founder at Outschool among them.

In late 2003, the concept for compute, which would later launch as EC2, was reformulated when Chris Pinkham and Benjamin Black presented a paper internally describing a vision for Amazon's retail computing infrastructure that was completely standardized, completely automated, and would rely extensively on web services for services such as storage and would draw on internal work already underway. Near the end of their paper, they mentioned the possibility of selling access to virtual servers as a service, proposing the company could generate revenue from the new infrastructure investment. Thereafter Pinkham, Willem van Biljon and lead developer Christopher Brown developed the Amazon EC2 service, with a team in Cape Town, South Africa.

In November 2004, AWS launched its first infrastructure service for public usage: Simple Queue Service (SQS).

S3, EC2, and other first generation services (2006–2010) 

On March 14, 2006, AWS launched Amazon S3 cloud storage followed by EC2 in August 2006. Andy Jassy, AWS founder and vice president in 2006, said at the time that Amazon S3 "helps free developers from worrying about where they are going to store data, whether it will be safe and secure, if it will be available when they need it, the costs associated with server maintenance, or whether they have enough storage available. Amazon S3 enables developers to focus on innovating with data, rather than figuring out how to store it." Pi Corporation, a startup Paul Maritz co-founded, was the first beta-user of EC2 outside of Amazon, whilst Microsoft was among EC2's first enterprise customers. Later that year, SmugMug, one of the early AWS adopters, attributed savings of around US$400,000 in storage costs to S3. According to Vogels, S3 was built with 8 microservices when it launched in 2006, but had over 300 microservices by 2022.

In September 2007, AWS announced its annual Start-up Challenge, a contest with prizes worth $100,000 for entrepreneurs and software developers based in the US using AWS services such as S3 and EC2 to build their businesses. The first edition saw participation from Justin.tv, which Amazon would later acquire in 2014. Ooyala, an online media company, was the eventual winner.

Additional AWS services from this period include SimpleDB, Mechanical Turk, Elastic Block Store, Elastic Beanstalk, Relational Database Service, DynamoDB, CloudWatch, Simple Workflow, CloudFront, and Availability Zones.

Growth (2010–2015) 

In November 2010, it was reported that all of Amazon.com's retail sites had migrated to AWS. Prior to 2012, AWS was considered a part of Amazon.com and so its revenue was not delineated in Amazon financial statements. In that year industry watchers for the first time estimated AWS revenue to be over $1.5 billion.

On November 27, 2012, AWS hosted its first major annual conference, re:Invent with a focus on AWS' partners and ecosystem, with over 150 sessions. The three-day event was held in Las Vegas because of its relatively cheaper connectivity with locations across the United States and the rest of the world. Andy Jassy and Werner Vogels presented keynotes, with Jeff Bezos joining Vogels for a fireside chat. AWS opened early registrations at  US$1099 per head for their customers from over 190 countries. On stage with Andy Jassy at the event which saw around 6000 attendees, Reed Hastings, CEO at Netflix, announced plans to migrate 100% of Netflix's infrastructure to AWS.

To support industry-wide training and skills standardization, AWS began offering a certification program for computer engineers, on April 30, 2013, to highlight expertise in cloud computing. Later that year, in October, AWS launched Activate, a program for start-ups worldwide to leverage AWS credits, third-party integrations, and free access to AWS experts to help build their business.

In 2014, AWS launched its partner network, AWS Partner Network (APN), which is focused on helping AWS-based companies grow and scale the success of their business with close collaboration and best practices.

In January 2015, Amazon Web Services acquired Annapurna Labs, an Israel-based microelectronics company for a reported US$350–370M.

In April 2015, Amazon.com reported AWS was profitable, with sales of $1.57 billion in the first quarter of the year and $265 million of operating income. Founder Jeff Bezos described it as a fast-growing $5 billion business; analysts described it as "surprisingly more profitable than forecast". In October, Amazon.com said in its Q3 earnings report that AWS's operating income was $521 million, with operating margins at 25 percent. AWS's 2015 Q3 revenue was $2.1 billion, a 78% increase from 2014's Q3 revenue of $1.17 billion. 2015 Q4 revenue for the AWS segment increased 69.5% y/y to $2.4 billion with a 28.5% operating margin, giving AWS a $9.6 billion run rate. In 2015, Gartner estimated that AWS customers are deploying 10x more infrastructure on AWS than the combined adoption of the next 14 providers.

Market leadership (2016–present) 

James Hamilton, who leads AWS' compute, data center, and network design, wrote a retrospective article in 2016 to highlight the ten-year history of the online service from 2006 to 2016. As an early fan and outspoken proponent of the technology, he joined the AWS engineering team in 2008.

In 2016 Q1, revenue was $2.57 billion with net income of $604 million, a 64% increase over 2015 Q1 that resulted in AWS being more profitable than Amazon's North American retail business for the first time. Jassy was thereafter promoted to CEO of the division. Around the same time, Amazon experienced a 42% rise in stock value as a result of increased earnings, of which AWS contributed 56% to corporate profits.

AWS had $17.46 billion in annual revenue in 2017. By end of 2020, the number had grown to $46 billion. Reflecting the success of AWS, Jassy's annual compensation in 2017 hit nearly $36 million.

In January 2018, Amazon launched an autoscaling service on AWS.

In November 2018, AWS announced customized ARM cores for use in its servers. Also in November 2018, AWS is developing ground stations to communicate with customer's satellites.

In 2019, AWS reported 37% yearly growth and accounted for 12% of Amazon's revenue (up from 11% in 2018).

In April 2021, AWS reported 32% yearly growth and accounted for 32% of $41.8 billion cloud market in Q1 2021.

In January 2022, AWS joined the MACH Alliance as an Enabler member. 

In June 2022, it was reported that in 2019 Capital One had not secured their AWS resources properly, and was subject to a data breach by a former AWS employee, Paige Thompson (It is important to note this was not an issue with AWS security, but rather how Capital One had used AWS). The employee was convicted of hacking into the company’s cloud servers to steal customer data and use computer power to mine cryptocurrency. The ex-employee was able to download the personal information of more than 100 million Capital One customers.

In June 2022, AWS announced they had launched the AWS snow cone a small, rugged, secure  edge computing device to the International Space Station on the Axiom Mission 1. The device had to be run through rigorous testing including vacuum, vibration, acoustic,  and thermal. The device did not need radiation hardening because it was being used in the shielded ISS environment.

In June 2022, Amazon announced and displayed a preview of their latest AI tools for programmers called CodeWhisperer. While currently only available to people who received an invitation though the AWS IDE Toolkit, CodeWhisperer is an IDE plugin that will examine the users code and comments and present users with syntactically correct suggestions. The Suggestions will be based on coding style and variable names and are not just snippets. Set to be free for the review period, the company will be charging for the product on a subscription bases upon full release.

Customer base 
 On March 14, 2006, Amazon said in a press release: "More than 150,000 developers have signed up to use Amazon Web Services since its inception."
 In November 2012, AWS hosted its first customer event in Las Vegas.
 On May 13, 2013, AWS was awarded an Agency Authority to Operate (ATO) from the U.S. Department of Health and Human Services under the Federal Risk and Authorization Management Program.
 In October 2013, it was revealed that AWS was awarded a $600M contract with the CIA.
 In August 2014, AWS received Department of Defense-Wide provisional authorization for all U.S. Regions.
 During the 2015 re:Invent keynote, AWS disclosed that they have more than a million active customers every month in 190 countries, including nearly 2,000 government agencies, 5,000 education institutions and more than 17,500 nonprofits.
 On April 5, 2017, AWS and DXC Technology (formed from a merger of CSC and HPE's Enterprise Services Business) announced an expanded alliance to increase access of AWS features for enterprise clients in existing data centers.

Notable customers include NASA, the Obama presidential campaign of 2012, and Netflix.

In 2019, it was reported that more than 80% of Germany's listed DAX companies use AWS.

In August 2019, the U.S. Navy said it moved 72,000 users from six commands to an AWS cloud system as a first step toward pushing all of its data and analytics onto the cloud.

In 2021, DISH Network announced they will develop and launch its 5G network on AWS.

In October 2021, it was reported that spy agencies and government departments in the UK such as GCHQ, MI5, MI6, and the Ministry of Defence, have contracted AWS to host their classified materials.

Multiple financial services firms have shifted to AWS in some form in recent years.

Significant service outages 

 On April 20, 2011, AWS suffered a major outage. Parts of the Elastic Block Store service became "stuck" and could not fulfill read/write requests. It took at least two days for service to be fully restored.
 On June 29, 2012, several websites that rely on Amazon Web Services were taken offline due to a severe storm in Northern Virginia, where AWS' largest data center cluster is located.
 On October 22, 2012, a major outage occurred, affecting many sites such as Reddit, Foursquare, Pinterest, and others. The cause was a memory leak bug in an operational data collection agent.
 On December 24, 2012, AWS suffered another outage causing websites such as Netflix to be unavailable for customers in the Northeastern United States. AWS cited their Elastic Load Balancing service as the cause.
 On February 28, 2017, AWS experienced a massive outage of S3 services in its Northern Virginia region. A majority of websites that relied on AWS S3 either hung or stalled, and Amazon reported within five hours that AWS was fully online again. No data has been reported to have been lost due to the outage. The outage was caused by a human error made while debugging, that resulted in removing more server capacity than intended, which caused a domino effect of outages.
 On November 25, 2020, AWS experienced several hours of outage on the Kinesis service in North Virginia (us-east-1) region. Other services relying on Kinesis were also impacted.
 On December 7, 2021, an outage mainly affected the Eastern United States, disrupting delivery service, streaming.

Availability and topology 
, AWS has distinct operations in 31 geographical "regions": 7 in North America, 1 in South America, 8 in Europe, 2 in the Middle East, 1 in Africa and 12 in Asia Pacific.

Each region is wholly contained within a single country and all of its data and services stay within the designated region. Each region has multiple "Availability Zones", which consist of one or more discrete data centers, each with redundant power, networking, and connectivity, housed in separate facilities. Availability Zones do not automatically provide additional scalability or redundancy within a region, since they are intentionally isolated from each other to prevent outages from spreading between Zones. Several services can operate across Availability Zones (e.g., S3, DynamoDB) while others can be configured to replicate across Zones to spread demand and avoid downtime from failures.

As of December 2014, Amazon Web Services operated an estimated 1.4 million servers across 11 regions and 28 availability zones. The global network of AWS Edge locations consists of over 300 points of presence worldwide, including locations in North America, Europe, Asia, Australia, Africa, and South America.

, AWS has announced the planned launch of four additional regions in Canada (Calgary), Israel, New Zealand, and Thailand.

In 2014, AWS claimed its aim was to achieve 100% renewable energy usage in the future.  In the United States, AWS's partnerships with renewable energy providers include Community Energy of Virginia, to support the US East region; Pattern Development, in January 2015, to construct and operate Amazon Wind Farm Fowler Ridge; Iberdrola Renewables, LLC, in July 2015, to construct and operate Amazon Wind Farm US East; EDP Renewables North America, in November 2015, to construct and operate Amazon Wind Farm US Central; and  Tesla Motors, to apply battery storage technology to address power needs in the US West (Northern California) region.

Pop-up lofts 

AWS also has "pop-up lofts" in different locations around the world. These market AWS to entrepreneurs and startups in different tech industries in a physical location. Visitors can work or relax inside the loft, or learn more about what they can do with AWS. In June 2014, AWS opened their first temporary pop-up loft in San Francisco. In May 2015 they expanded to New York City, and in September 2015 expanded to Berlin. AWS opened its fourth location, in Tel Aviv from March 1, 2016, to March 22, 2016. A pop-up loft was open in London from September 10 to October 29, 2015. The pop-up lofts in New York and San Francisco are indefinitely closed due to the COVID-19 pandemic while Tokyo has remained open in a limited capacity.

Charitable work 
In 2017, AWS launched AWS re/Start in the United Kingdom to help young adults and military veterans retrain in technology-related skills.  In partnership with the Prince's Trust and the Ministry of Defence (MoD), AWS will help to provide re-training opportunities for young people from disadvantaged backgrounds and former military personnel.  AWS is working alongside a number of partner companies including Cloudreach, Sage Group, EDF Energy, and Tesco Bank.

In April 2022, AWS announced the organization has committed more than $30 million over three years to early-stage start-ups led by Black, Latino, LGBTQIA+, and Women founders as part of its AWS impact Accelerator. The Initiative offers qualifying start-ups up to $225,000 in cash, credits, extensive training, mentoring, technical guidance and includes up to $100,000 in AWS service credits.

Environmental impact 

In 2016, Greenpeace assessed major tech companies—including cloud services providers like AWS, Microsoft, Oracle, Google, IBM, Salesforce.com and Rackspace—based on their level of "clean energy" usage. Greenpeace evaluated companies on their mix of renewable-energy sources; transparency; renewable-energy commitment and policies; energy efficiency and greenhouse-gas mitigation; renewable-energy procurement; and advocacy. The group gave AWS an overall "C" grade. Greenpeace credited AWS for its advances toward greener computing in recent years, its plans to launch multiple wind and solar farms across the United States. The organization stated that Amazon is opaque about its carbon footprint.

In January 2021, AWS joined an industry pledge to achieve climate neutrality of data centers by 2030, the Climate Neutral Data Centre Pact.

Denaturalization protest 

US Department of Homeland Security has employed the software ATLAS, which runs on Amazon Cloud. It scanned more than 16.5 million of records of naturalized Americans and flagged approximately 124,000 of them for manual analysis and review by USCIS officers regarding denaturalization. Some of the scanned data came from Terrorist Screening Database and National Crime Information Center. The algorithm and the criteria for the algorithm were secret. Amazon faced protests from its own employees and activists for the anti-migrant collaboration with authorities.

See also 

 Cloud-computing comparison
 Comparison of file hosting services
 Tim Bray
 James Gosling

Notes

References

External links 

 

 
2006 software
Web Services
Cloud computing providers
Cloud infrastructure
Cloud platforms
Web hosting